Entwistle is an English surname. Notable people with the surname include:

 Alan Entwistle (1949–1996), British scholar
 Antony Beauchamp Entwistle (1918–1957), British photographer
 Bobby Entwistle (1938–2000), English footballer
 Cyril Entwistle (1887–1974), British politician
 Darren Entwistle (b. 1962), Canadian businessman
 David Entwistle (b. 1964), United States Virgin Islands Olympic bobsledder
 Edward Entwistle (1815–1909), English railroad engineer
 Ernest Entwistle Cheesman (1898-1983), English botanist
 George Entwistle (b. 1962), British television producer
 Harold Entwistle, English-born American actor and theatre director
 Harry Entwistle (b. 1940), English-born Australian priest
 Ian Entwistle (b. 1986), English mixed martial artist
 James F. Entwistle (b. 1956), American diplomat
 John Entwistle (1944–2002), the original bass guitarist of The Who
 John Entwistle (cyclist) (1932-2013), British cyclist
 Jonty Entwistle (1868–unknown), English footballer
 Neil Entwistle (b. 1978), convicted of the 2006 murder of his wife and daughter
 Noel Entwistle (b. 1936), UK educational psychologist
 Peg Entwistle (1908–1932), British actress
 Ralph Entwistle (c. 1805–1830), English-Australian bushranger
 Robert Entwistle (1941–2019), English cricketer
 Vicky Entwistle (b. 1968), British actress
 Wayne Entwistle (b; 1958), English footballer

See also
Entwisle, a related surname

English-language surnames